E. J. Harrison (born June 22, 1976) is a former American professional basketball player. A 6 foot 1 inch guard, Harrison was part of the 1998–99 Connecticut Huskies men's basketball team who won the 1999 NCAA Division I men's basketball tournament. Harrison spent most of his professional career in the United Kingdom.

College career

Harrison played collegiately at Western Connecticut State University for two seasons before transferring to the University of Connecticut. At UConn, he was a member of the Connecticut Huskies men's basketball team that won the 1999 NCAA Division I men's basketball tournament. At WCSU, he was the Little East Conference Rookie of the Year for the 1994–95 season and a conference first team member for the 1995–96 season.

Professional career

Following his collegiate career, Harrison has played professionally, primarily in England. He played for the Teesside Mohawks from 1999 to 2000 and 2001–2004, the Reading Rockets from 2004 to 2006, and the since-renamed Tees Valley Mohawks in 2007.

From 2007 to 2009, he played for Guildford Heat. In Harrison's first season there, he won the BBL Trophy, where he was named the Most Valuable Player in the final, and the BBL Play-offs. He was also named in the league's team of the year. In his second season, the Heat finished as runners-up in the BBL Trophy.

Harrison played for the Milton Keynes Lions in the 2009–2010 season.

In 2010, Harrison signed for Scotland's Glasgow Rocks where he was the team's captain. In his final season there, Harrison struggled with injuries and the Rocks finished as runners-up in the BBL Trophy.

Harrison retired following the 2013–14 season.

References

External links
Guildford profile 
Historical UConn basketball statistics

1976 births
Living people
American expatriate basketball people in the United Kingdom
American expatriate sportspeople in England
American expatriate sportspeople in Scotland
American men's basketball players
Basketball players from Connecticut
Glasgow Rocks players
London Lions (basketball) players
Sportspeople from Danbury, Connecticut
Surrey Scorchers players
UConn Huskies men's basketball players
Western Connecticut State Colonials men's basketball players